Ritual are an English electronic musical group, songwriters and producers from London, United Kingdom. The three-piece band consists of Adam Midgley aka Adam Gross, Tommy Baxter, and Gerard O'Connell. While they became known for their work with others, most notably the gold UK single, "Hotter Than Hell" from Dua Lipa, since 2014 they have released four EPs, as well as an audio-visual project called, No Escape Out of Time. In 2019, Ritual released their Dreamers Never Learn album, and single, "Love Me Back" featuring Tove Styrke.

According to Billboard, Ritual uses "minimalist instrumentation, male-female vocal pairing and deeply personal but accessible lyrics," that "feels honest and fresh."

Career

History
Ritual was formed by producers Tommy Baxter and Adam Gross in the London music scene where Baxter was a touring guitarist, while Gross created hip-hop beats for independent UK artists. They met Gerard O'Connnell, who was writing songs with the Xenomania production house for the likes of Kylie Minogue. As a trio, they wrote songs for other artists and released their own EPs beginning December 2014 with their debut, The Fall.

Ritual were signed to Island, who picked up their debut, and released their second EP, From the City to the Wilderness, in March 2015. "Josephine" was the lead single from the EP described as "a marvelously down tempo tune, all plaintive piano chords, guitars, shuffling beats and a dreamy exchange between the Ritual front man and Lisa Hannigan (a solo singer and frequent, early-years Damien Rice collaborator)." The second single released off From City to the Wilderness was "Low Season".

A hip hop remix version of the EP called From the Wilderness to the City was released shortly after in June 2015. "Low Season," with added vocals from Raye, was the first track released from the remix EP.

In 2015, the three participated in writing sessions for R&B artist Mononoke, (real name Katie Taylor) and she became the featured guest vocalist on the second single called "Bottle Tops" from Ritual's third EP entitled Every Night Another But Not You. From there, Ritual then went on to feature Mononoke's vocals on the full No Escape Out of Time project.

In September 2017, Ritual released a 10-song audio visual project entitled No Escape Out of Time, where every song had a video accompaniment directed by Jackson Ducasse. No Escape Out of Time ties together the previous music videos for "Drown the Lovers" and "Wouldn't Be Love" with a final installment for "Better By Now," making a full story line about love and loss.

For the remix of "Drown the Lovers," Ritual recruited 6lack to rap a verse on the track. Zane Lowe premiered the remix as a World Record on Beats 1 radio. For another song off the EP, Denzel Curry contributes a verse to "Real Feels."

The song, "The Only One" was featured on the  soundtrack to the Jaden Smith-starring film, "Skate Kitchen". The album, on Darkroom/Interscope Records, came out September 2018 following the August release of the film.

In January 2019, Ritual released the first single from their new album, Dreamers Never Learn, which features the band and numerous female artists in a series of 21st Century love songs. The single, "Love Me Back",  was co-written by Grammy-nominated Emily Warren and features the vocals of Swedish pop singer, Tove Styrke. Of "Love Me Back", Mother Jones magazine wrote: "In this single, all of its beats—the melody, the lyrics, the rhythm, and the delivery—hit all the points from start to finish."

Work with others
Ritual have written songs for other artists, including Dua Lipa, Bishop Briggs, Avicii, Little Mix, among others.

For the UK indie pop singer, Frances, they produced and contributed guest vocals on the track, "When It Comes to Us," for her debut EP, Grow, in July 2015. The song was the second single from the album.

The group wrote the gold-selling UK single "Hotter Than Hell" for Dua Lipa, which was included on her self-titled debut album, both released in 2016. In Rolling Stone, Lipa credits working with Ritual as the time when she found her songwriting style.

In October 2016, Ritual wrote and were featured on "You Remain," a song from French DJ and record producer Kungs on his Layers album released a month later.

Their 2019 album, Dreamers Never Learn features the vocals of Tove Styrke, and other female singers.

Tours

Support
LANY (2017)

Discography

Studio albums

Extended plays

Singles

As lead artists

As featured artists

Production/songwriting credits

References

Universal Records artists
British electronic music groups